The Collegium Fridericianum (also known as the Friedrichskolleg, Friedrichskollegium, and Friedrichs-Kollegium) was a prestigious gymnasium in Königsberg, Prussia. Alumni were known as Friderizianer.

History

18th century

Using the Francke school of Halle (Saale) as a model, Theodor Gehr (died 1705), an official of Brandenburg-Prussia, founded a Pietist private school in Sackheim on 11 August 1698. It became a royal school of Frederick I, King in Prussia, on 4 March 1701. For 16,000 guilder in 1703, it acquired the hall of Obermarschall von Creytzen on Collegiengasse in eastern Löbenicht and was designated the Collegium Fridericianum or Friedrichskolleg in honor of Frederick on 10 May. The Pietist school was the first in Königsberg not to be affiliated with a parish church. The school's first director in 1702 was Heinrich Lysius (1670-1731) of Flensburg, pastor of Löbenicht Church. The school received an organ built by Johann Josua Mosengel in 1707.

The Collegium was admired by King Frederick William I of Prussia; in a decree on 25 October 1735 the king mentioned the school as an example for other schools in Prussia. Over 50 Baltic German students went to the school before attending university in the 18th century. Immanuel Kant began attending the school in 1732, while Johann Gottfried Herder taught there from 1763 to 1764. The school consisted of a Latin school, a German school, and a boarding school often used by foreign students. It also contained a wooden tower utilized as an observatory and a small church in service until 1853.

19th century

The Collegium was elevated to a gymnasium on 4 September 1810, the first in Prussia, under the direction of Friedrich August Gotthold. The school had three teachers and eighteen Abitur students volunteer during the War of the Sixth Coalition in 1813, with ten dying during the fighting, including three at Großgörschen. Eight representatives of the 1848 Frankfurt Parliament were Friderizianer: Eduard von Simson, Georg Bernhard Simson, Friedrich Wilhelm Schubert, Ludwig Wilhelm zu Dohna-Lauck, Johann August Muttray, Gustav von Saltzwedel, Anton von Wegnern, and Johann Jacoby.

The gymnasium's building was dismantled and rebuilt in 1853, with the new structure dedicated on 17 October 1855. In 1858 the 36,000 volume library of Director Friedrich August Gotthold was donated to the Royal and University Library. The gymnasium counted 508 students in 1865. During the Franco-Prussian War the school's volunteers included two teachers and nine students, all of whom survived the war.

In 1890 the Prussian government acquired the property of the stately Groß Jägerhof on Jägerhofstraße between Königstraße and Vorder-Roßgarten. The school moved into this new property, which was remodeled by Ernst von Ihne and dedicated in 1893. The Collegium's former location on Collegiengasse was later used by the Burgschule. The teacher Gustav Zippel began a history of the Friedrichskollegium to commemorate its bicentennial in 1898.

20th century

In 1901 the Friedrichskollegium consisted of 32 teachers and 845 students; it was the largest school in Königsberg prior to World War I. By 1902 its faculty library consisted of 9,000 volumes and its student library had 1,200 volumes. Upon the outbreak of war in 1914, 20 teachers and 139 students volunteered for service, with hundreds following during the course of the war. Casualties included three teachers and fifty students.

The gymnasium was destroyed during the 1944 Bombing of Königsberg in World War II, with interim classes ceasing in January 1945. At least 160 representatives of the school had been killed during the war or in its aftermath by 1948. The Landfermann-Gymnasium of Duisburg has sponsored the traditions of the former Friedrichskollegium through several endowments since 28 May 1955.

Notable people

Directors
Heinrich Lysius (1670-1731), from 1702–1731
Georg Friedrich Rogall (1701-1733), from 1731–1733
Franz Albert Schultz (1692-1763), from 1733–1763 
Friedrich August Gotthold (1778-1858), from 1810–1852
Johannes Horkel (1820-1861), from 1852–1860
Theodor Adler, from 1861–1863
Gustav Heinrich Wagner (1820-1878), from 1863
Albert Lehnerdt (1827-1897)
Georg Ellendt (1840-1908), from 1891-1908
Paul Glogau, from 1908-1913
Alfred Rausch (1858-1939), from 1913-1923
Bruno Schumacher (1879-1957), from 1934-1945

Teachers
Friedrich Wilhelm Barthold (1799-1858), historian
Johann Wilhelm Ebel (1784-1861), theologian
Xaver von Hasenkamp (1826-1911), editor of the Königsberger Hartungsche Zeitung
Johann Gottfried Herder (1744-1803), philosopher
Heinrich Otto Hoffmann (1816-1893), mathematician
Karl Lachmann (1793-1851), philologist
Karl Marold (1850-1909), Germanist
Krzysztof Celestyn Mrongovius (1764-1855), translator
Otto Schöndorffer (1887-1926), philologist
Ernst Gustav Zaddach (1817-1880), zoologist
Hugo Albert Nehrenheim, teacher

Students
Paul Adloff (1870-1944), dentist and anthropologist
Adolf von Batocki (1868-1944), Governor of East Prussia
Hermann Bobrik (1814-1845), historian and geographer
Karl Böttcher (1838-1900), philologist and director of the Burgschule
Franz Brandstäter (1815-1883), philologist
Friedrich Reinhold Dietz (1805-1836), philologist
Friedrich Dewischeit (1805-1884), poet
Ludwig Wilhelm zu Dohna-Lauck (1805-1895), politician 
Traugott Fedtke (1909-1988), organist and composer
Fritz Gause (1893-1973), historian
Klaus von der Groeben (1902-2002), jurist
Karl Haffner (1804-1876), dramatist
Theophil Herbst (1806-1868), philologist
David Hilbert (1862-1943), mathematician
Hermann Theodor Hoffmann (1836-1902), lord mayor of Königsberg from 1893 to 1902
Johann Jacoby (1805-1877, politician
Immanuel Kant (1724-1804), philosopher
Friedrich Julius Kieschke (1819-1895), lord mayor of Königsberg from 1867 to 1872
Gustav Kordgien (1838-1907), professor
Hans Kramer (1896-1982), forester
Georg David Kypke (1724-1779), Orientalist
Georg Lejeune-Dirichlet (1858-1920), pedagogue
August Lilienthal (1814-1852), philologist
Hugo Linck (1890-1976), pastor in Königsberg until 1948
Fritz Albert Lipmann (1899-1986), biochemist and Nobel Prize recipient
Hans Lullies (1898-1982), physiologist
Daniel Gotthilf Moldenhawer (1753-1823), philologist
Johann Heinrich Daniel Moldenhawer (1709-1790, theologian
Ernst Mollmann (1850-1939), philologist
Herbert Meinhard Mühlpfordt (1893-1902), historian
Bernhard Mrowka (1907-1973), physicist
Johann August Muttray (1808-1872), physician
Ludwig Passarge (1825-1912), writer
Siegfried Passarge (1866-1958), geographer
Reinhold Rehs (1901-1971), politician
Albert Reusch (1816-1892), philologist
David Ruhnken (1723-1798), classicist
Johann Georg Rosenhain (1816-1887), mathematician
Otto Saro (1818-1888), prosecutor and politician
Gustav von Saltzwedel (1808-1897), politician
Dietrich von Saucken (1892–1980), general
Alexander Schmidt (1816-1887), philologist
Friedrich Ludwig Schröder (1744-1816), actor
Friedrich Wilhelm Schubert (1799-1868), historian
Eduard von Simson (1810-1899), politician
Georg Bernhard Simson (1817-1897), politician
Siegfried Thomaschki (1894-1967), artillery general
Siegfried von der Trenck (1882-1951), writer
Ernst Wilhelm Wagner (1857-1927), director of the Wilhelmsgymnasium
Anton von Wegnern (1809-1891), politician
Albert Zweck (1857-1934), geographer

Notes

References

External links
Landfermann-Gymnasium

1698 establishments in the Holy Roman Empire
1944 disestablishments in Germany
Buildings and structures in Germany destroyed during World War II
Educational institutions established in the 1690s
Educational institutions disestablished in 1944
Education in Königsberg
Former buildings and structures in Königsberg
Gymnasiums in Germany